Spike: The Virus Vs. The People - the Inside Story is a 2021 book by British medical researcher Jeremy Farrar and British Indian science journalist Anjana Ahuja. The book gives Farrar's account of the COVID-19 pandemic, his view of government policy as a member of Britain's Scientific Advisory Group for Emergencies, and his fears about the virus’s origins.

References 

2021 non-fiction books
Profile Books books
Books about the COVID-19 pandemic